A. cinnabarina may refer to:

 Aphelandra cinnabarina, a plant endemic to Ecuador
 Arthonia cinnabarina, a lichenized fungus